Vietomartyria nanlingana is a species of moth belonging to the family Micropterigidae. It was described by Hashimoto & Hirowatari in 2009. It is known from Nanling, Guangdong in southern China.

References

Micropterigidae
Moths described in 2009